Hickmania is a monotypic genus of Australian cribellate araneomorph spiders in the family Gradungulidae, containing only the Tasmanian cave spider (Hickmania troglodytes). The genus was first described by Willis J. Gertsch in 1958, and has been found only in Tasmania. It is the last of an old Gondwanan lineage, long since separated from its closest relatives in South America. It is an icon species for faunal conservation in Tasmania, and is named in honor of V. V. Hickman, a professor at the University of Tasmania, who specialized in spiders. The species name is derived from the Ancient Greek  (troglodytes), meaning "cave-dweller".

Description 
Tasmanian cave spiders have red to brown carapaces and duller, darker brown opisthosomae. These primitive spiders use book lungs to breathe, seen as four light patches beneath the abdomen.

Males are smaller than females, and have a distinct kink-like curve near the end of each second leg used to hold the female's head while mating.

Neural arrangement in the pedipalps of male H. troglodytes  is almost identical to the neural arrangement in the pedipalps of male running crab spiders Philodromus cespitum.

Tasmanian cave spiders are widely distributed throughout Tasmania, found in many dark, cool areas, including underground drainage and cave systems, the underside of bridges, and inside hollow logs. They have an unusually long lifetime for araneomorph spiders, sometimes living several decades.

References

External links 
Tasmanian cave spider at the Australian Museum website
 More info + picture

Austrochilidae
Spiders of Australia
Invertebrates of Tasmania
Cave spiders
Monotypic Araneomorphae genera
Taxa named by Willis J. Gertsch